The 1997 NBA draft took place on June 25, 1997, at Charlotte Coliseum in Charlotte, North Carolina. The Vancouver Grizzlies had the highest probability to win the NBA draft lottery, but since they were an expansion team along with the  Toronto Raptors  they were not allowed to select first in this draft.  Although the Boston Celtics had the second-worst record in the 1996–97 season and the best odds (36 percent) of winning the lottery with two picks, the Spurs  lost David Robinson and Sean Elliott to injury early in the season, finished with the third-worst record, and subsequently won the lottery. Leading up to the draft, there was no doubt that Tim Duncan would be selected at No. 1 by the Spurs as he was considered to be far and away the best prospect. After Duncan, the rest of the draft was regarded with some skepticism. The Celtics had the third and sixth picks, selecting Chauncey Billups and Ron Mercer, both of whom were traded in the next two years.

The Washington Wizards forfeited their 1997 first-round pick in connection with the signing of Juwan Howard. (Washington would have had the 17th pick.) Thus, the draft only had 28 first-round selections and 57 selections overall.

Draft selections

Notable undrafted players 
These players eligible for the 1997 NBA Draft were not selected but played in the NBA.

Early entrants

College underclassmen
The following college basketball players successfully applied for early draft entrance.

  Gracen Averil – G, Texas Tech (junior)
  Tony Battie – F/C, Texas Tech (junior)
  Chauncey Billups – G, Colorado (sophomore)
  Carl Blanton – F, Sinclair CC (junior)
  Mark Blount – C/F, Pittsburgh (sophomore)
  C. J. Bruton – G, Indian Hills CC (sophomore)
  Dan Buie – F, Washburn (junior)
  James Cotton – G, Long Beach State (junior)
  Tony Doyle – F, Columbia (junior)
  Ian Folmar – F, Slippery Rock (junior)
  Danny Fortson – F, Cincinnati (junior)
  Adonal Foyle – C/F, Colgate (junior)
  Darryl Hardy – F, Winston–Salem State (junior)
  Antjonne Holmes – F, Central Baptist (freshman)
  Troy Hudson – G, Southern Illinois (junior)
  Marc Jackson – F/C, Temple
  Stephen Jackson – F/G, Butler CC (freshman)
  Ed Jenkins – F, Ohio State (junior)
  Marcus Johnson – F, Long Beach State (junior)
  Damon Jones – G, Houston (junior)
  Nate Langley – G, George Mason (junior)
  Keith Love – G, Rosary (junior)
  Gordon Malone – F, West Virginia (junior)
  Amere May – F, Shaw (junior)
  Elgie McCoy – F, Kutztown (junior)
  Ron Mercer – G/F, Kentucky (sophomore)
  Victor Page – G, Georgetown (sophomore)
  Shawn Ritzie – G, Norwalk CC (sophomore)
  Paul Rogers – F/C, Gonzaga (junior)
  Bryon Ruffner – F, BYU (junior)
  Olivier Saint-Jean – San Jose State (junior)
  Mark Sanford – F, Washington (junior)
  God Shammgod – G, Providence (sophomore)
  Maurice Taylor – F, Michigan (junior)
  Tim Thomas – F, Villanova (freshman)
  Mark Young – F, Kansas State (junior)

High school players
The following high school players successfully applied for early draft entrance.

  Tracy McGrady – G/F, Mount Zion Christian Academy (Durham, North Carolina)

International players
The following international players successfully applied for early draft entrance.

  Marko Milič – G/F, Smelt Olimpija (Slovenia)

Other eligible players

See also
 List of first overall NBA draft picks

References

External links
 
 1997 NBA Draft at Basketball-reference

Draft
National Basketball Association draft
NBA draft
NBA draft
Basketball in North Carolina
Events in Charlotte, North Carolina
Basketball in Charlotte, North Carolina